Skofteland is a village in Lindesnes municipality in Agder county, Norway. From Skofteland, there is a road which runs to the northeast to Fuskeland, a small village to the north of the town of Mandal.

References

Villages in Agder
Lindesnes